Brad Foy (born September 6, 1985) is an American professional stock car racing driver. He last competed part-time in the NASCAR Camping World Truck Series, driving the No. 15 Chevrolet Silverado for Premium Motorsports.

Racing career

NASCAR Camping World Truck Series
Foy intended to attempt the 2015 Kroger 200 in the No. 0 Chevrolet Silverado for Jennifer Jo Cobb Racing, but withdrew from the race.

In 2016, Foy failed to qualify for the Texas Roadhouse 200 in the No. 10 Chevrolet Silverado for Jennifer Jo Cobb Racing. He spun and hit the wall with just under two minutes remaining in the first round of qualifying.

In 2018, Foy participated in his first NASCAR race, driving the No. 15 Chevrolet Silverado for Premium Motorsports at Martinsville.

Motorsports career results

NASCAR
(key) (Bold – Pole position awarded by qualifying time. Italics – Pole position earned by points standings or practice time. * – Most laps led.)

Camping World Truck Series

References

Living people
1985 births
NASCAR drivers
Racing drivers from Virginia

External links